The Great Jazz Piano of Phineas Newborn Jr. is an album by American jazz pianist Phineas Newborn Jr. recorded in 1961 and 1962 and released on the Contemporary label.

Reception
The Allmusic review by Scott Yanow states "This recording lives up to its title. In his prime, Phineas Newborn had phenomenal technique (on the level of an Oscar Peterson), a creative imagination, and plenty of energy... This is piano jazz at its highest level".

Track listing
 "Celia" (Bud Powell) – 4:42
 "This Here" (Bobby Timmons) – 4:17
 "Domingo" (Benny Golson) – 5:47
 "Prelude to a Kiss" (Duke Ellington, Irving Gordon, Irving Mills) – 5:57
 "Well, You Needn't" (Thelonious Monk) – 4:53
 "Theme for Basie" (Phineas Newborn Jr.) – 3:36
 "New Blues" (Newborn) – 4:29
 "Way Out West" (Sonny Rollins) – 4:13
 "Four" (Miles Davis) – 3:56 		  
Recorded at Contemporary Records Studio in Hollywood, CA on November 21, 1961 (tracks 1–4) and September 12, 1962 (tracks 5–8)

Personnel
Phineas Newborn Jr. – piano
Sam Jones (tracks 6-9), Leroy Vinnegar (tracks 1-5) – bass
Louis Hayes (tracks 6-9), Milt Turner (tracks 1-5) – drums

References

Contemporary Records albums
Phineas Newborn Jr. albums
1963 albums